Rabotbreen is a glacier in Sabine Land at Spitsbergen, Svalbard. The glacier is a tributary glacier to Fimbulisen, and is located in the upper part of Sassendalen. Nearby mountains are Bairdfjellet and Moskusryggen.

Name

The glacier is named after French geographer and Arctic explorer Charles Rabot.

References

Glaciers of Spitsbergen